The Kugisho B3Y, or Navy Type 92 Carrier Attack Bomber, also popularly titled Yokosuka B3Y, was a Japanese carrier-based torpedo bomber of the 1930s. It was designed by the Naval Air Technical Arsenal at Yokosuka, and while unimpressive during testing, it was ordered into service by the Imperial Japanese Navy and used until replaced by more capable aircraft.

Development and design
In 1932, the Imperial Japanese Navy had a requirement, 7-Shi, for a new torpedo bomber to replace the Mitsubishi B2M. The air arsenal at Yokosuka prepared its own design to meet this requirement, competing against designs by Mitsubishi and Nakajima.

The resulting aircraft was a three-seat single-engine biplane, with a fuselage of steel tube construction and two-bay wooden wings that could fold rearwards for storage aboard aircraft carriers. It was powered by a single Hiro Type 91 W engine rated at 450 kW (600 hp).

Testing proved that the aircraft had poor stability and control, and that the engine was unreliable. The competing Mitsubishi and Nakajima aircraft were even less successful however, and after modifications made by Tokuichiro Gomei of Aichi Kokuki, the aircraft was accepted by the Navy in August 1933 as the Kugisho Navy Type 92 Carrier Attack Bomber, with a short designation of B3Y1, with production by Aichi, Watanabe and the Hiro Naval Arsenal, 129 being produced by the time that production finished in 1936.

Operational history
The B3Y1 continued to be prone to engine problems, which frequently caused the type to be grounded. It served operationally in the early part of the Second Sino-Japanese War, gaining a good reputation for accurate level bombing against small targets. The Yokosuka B3Y was gradually phased out of operational service, being replaced by Aichi's D1A dive bomber and Yokosuka's B4Y torpedo bomber.

Operators

 Imperial Japanese Navy Air Service

Specifications (B3Y1)

See also

References

External links

 
 

Yokosuka, Kugisho B3Y
B3Y
Carrier-based aircraft
Single-engined tractor aircraft
Biplanes